Olsi Bishani (born 11 January 1988 in Shkodër) is an Albanian football goalkeeper who plays for KS Ada Velipojë in the Albanian First Division.

External links
 Profile at Vllaznia.eu

1988 births
Living people
Footballers from Shkodër
Albanian footballers
Association football goalkeepers
KF Vllaznia Shkodër players
KF Laçi players
KS Ada Velipojë players
KF Trepça players
Kategoria Superiore players
Albanian expatriate footballers
Expatriate footballers in Kosovo
Albanian expatriate sportspeople in Kosovo